Olorun (Yoruba alphabet: Ọlọrun) is the ruler of (or in) the Heavens in the Yoruba religion. The Supreme God or Supreme Being in the Yoruba pantheon, Olorun is also called Olodumare (Yoruba alphabet: Olódùmarè).

Humans do not worship Olorun directly; there are no sacred areas of worship, no iconography, nor ordained person. Olorun is outlying, distant, and does not partake in human rituals. There are no shrines or sacrifices dedicated directly to them, although followers can send prayers in their direction. 

Olorun has no gender in the Ifá Literary Corpus, and is always referred to as an entity who exists in spiritual form only.  Christian missionaries, such as Bolaji Idowu, aimed to reinterpret traditional Yoruba culture as consistent with Christian theology as a way of pushing conversion. The first translation of the Bible into Yoruba in the late 1800s by Samuel Ajayi Crowther controversially adopted traditional Yoruba names, such as "Olodumare/Olorun" for "God" and "Eshu" for the devil, and thus began associating Olorun with a male gender.

For Yoruba traditions, there is no centralized authority; because of this, there are many different ways that Yoruba people and their descendants or orisa-based faiths can understand the idea of Olorun. Historically, the Yoruba worship Olorun through the agency of the orisa; thus there is no image, shrine or sacrifice made directly towards Olorun. There is some controversy about whether Olodumare is directly worshiped, due to their aloofness from humanity. However, there are those who also worship Olodumare directly. Olodumare is the origin of virtue and mortality, and bestows the knowledge of things upon all persons when they are born. They are omnipotent, transcendent, unique, all knowing, good, and evil. The Yoruba call on Olodumare when other deities (orishas) seem unwilling or incapable to help. These orisa or orishas are supernatural beings, both good (egungun) and bad (ajogun), who represent human activity and natural forces. Yoruba believe Olodumare created all other forces of the universe to help continue the evolution of the universe.

Olofi or Olofin is the name given to one of the three manifestations of the Supreme God in the yoruba religion. Olofi is the ruler of the Earth.  
The Supreme God has three manifestations: Olodumare, the Creator; Olorun, ruler of the heavens; and Olofi, who is the conduit between Orún (Heaven) and Ayé (Earth).

Western ideology
Olodumare - (The Father) The Lord God of the Source of Creation
 Olorun - (The Son) The Lord God of Heaven
 Olofin - (The Holy Spirit) The Lord God of the Palace, conduit between Heaven and Earth

Etymology 
From the Yoruba language, Olorun's name is a contraction of the words oní (which denotes ownership or rulership) and ọ̀run (which means the Heavens, abode of the spirits).

Another name, Olodumare, name comes from the phrase "O ní odù mà rè" meaning "the owner of the source of creation that does not become empty," "or the All Sufficient"

In popular culture
Olorun is mentioned in the song "the rhythm of the saints" from the 1990 solo album The Rhythm of the Saints by Paul Simon.
Olorun appears as one of the gods in the Smite game series.

References 

 OGUMEFU, M. I., Yorùbá Legends, London, The Sheldon Press, 1929.
 IDOWU, E. BÔLAJI., Olódùmarè: God in Yorùbá Belief, London, Longmans, 1962.
Adebola Omolara Adebileje, ' A Comparative Description of Affixation Processes in English and Yoruba

God in the Yoruba religion
Names of God in African traditional religions
Sky and weather gods
Umbanda
Yoruba gods